λ Pavonis, Latinized as Lambda Pavonis, is a single, variable star in the southern constellation of Pavo. It is a blue-white hued star that is faintly visible to the naked eye with an apparent visual magnitude that fluctuates around 4.22. This object is located approximately 1,400 light years from the Sun, based upon parallax. It is a member of the Scorpius–Centaurus association.

This is a massive Be star, a rapidly rotating hot blue star which has developed a gas disk around it. It is a γ Cassiopeiae variable or shell star which has occasionally brightened to magnitude 4.0. The stellar classification of B2Ve suggests it is a B-type main-sequence star that is generating energy through core hydrogen fusion. This star is spinning rapidly with a projected rotational velocity of 190 km/s. This is giving the star an oblate shape with an equatorial bulge that is an estimated 10% larger than the polar radius. Lambda Pavonis has 12.5 times the mass of the Sun and nine times the Sun's polar radius. It is radiating 8,450 times the luminosity of the Sun from its photosphere at an effective temperature of 20,300 K.

Variations in signals coming from Lambda Pavonis have led to a debate on whether it is a binary, single or pulsating variable star.

References

B-type main-sequence stars
B-type bright giants
Be stars
Gamma Cassiopeiae variable stars

Pavo (constellation)
Pavonis, Lambda
Durchmusterung objects
173948
092609
7074
Scorpius–Centaurus association